Rajinder Kumar Malhotra (R.K. Malhotra), (born 15 July 1947) is an Indian business professional associated with the agricultural chemicals industry for over four decades. He has been the Chief Executive and President of Indofil Industries Limited since 1994. Malhotra heads Indofil, which is a part of K.K. Modi’s conglomerate with diverse business interests in tobacco, chemicals, entertainment, education and other sectors.

Personal life

Malhotra was born on 15 July 1947 in Delhi. His parents — an ex-army man the late Shri. Raghubirnath and the late Smt. Kailash Kumari had four children. During his formative years, Malhotra excelled in academics, and also in extra-curricular activities like drama and dance amongst others. Malhotra graduated (B.Sc. Ag.) from the University of Udaipur and completed his Post Graduation - M.Sc. in Plant Pathology from the prestigious G. B. Pant University of Agriculture & Technology, Pantnagar in 1971. He is married to Madhu and has two children— daughter Loveena Saigal and son Yuvraj. Yuvraj is an entrepreneur, whereas Loveena is a working professional.

Career

The Indian Agricultural Research Institute (IARI) in New Delhi was the first step in Malhotra’s professional life. After earning his stripes at IARI for two years, he joined Indofil in 1973 in the sales department. His initial time at Indofil was spent building the company’s market share by visiting remote villages and meeting farmers to help the organisation gain a firm footing in the agricultural sector. In 1994, he was named as the Chief Executive. During his time at the helm of affairs at Indofil, Malhotra oversaw revenue growth of over 600% from Rs.130 Crores in 1994 to Rs.1,023 Crores in 2012. One of his major decisions after becoming the Chief Executive of the company was to launch the International Business Division in 1995, which has reaped rich rewards since its inception. Since then, the company grown in stature internationally and now has a presence in 92 countries.

In 2012, he facilitated a joint venture— Indo Baijin Chemicals with Chinese company Shanghai Baijin Chemical Group for manufacturing green energy CS2. Continuing in the collaborative spirit, Indofil acquired the right to conduct business in Europe for Dithane fungicide from Dow AgroSciences LLC.  The company was recognised as the "Best Company from an Emerging Region" at the AGROW awards, London, in 2010.

Awards and recognition

Lifetime Achievement award from Cotton Research & Development Association (CRDA)— 2012.

Outstanding Executive of the decade award from the Unity International Foundation— 2010-11

References 

1947 births
Living people
Mohanlal Sukhadia University alumni